The 2009 European Junior Badminton Championships were held in Federal Technical Centre - Palabadminton, Milan, Italy, between April 3 and April 15, 2009.

Medalists

Medal table

References

External links
bwf.tournamentsoftware.com: European Junior Championships 2009
bwf.tournamentsoftware.com: European Junior Team Championships 2009

2009
European Junior Badminton Championships
Badminton tournaments in Italy
2007 in Italian sport